Sonia Singh (born 21 September 1970) is an Indian journalist who serves as the editorial director and president of the NDTV ethics committee. She also hosts ‘The NDTV Dialogues’, a show focusing on understanding on key issues and a look at potential solutions.

Early life and education

Sonia Singh, attended the Convent of Jesus and Mary in New Delhi, then went to St Stephens College, Delhi where she completed her masters in English Literature. She graduated with a first degree, topping the college in English Literature. She has also been recipient of a 3-month scholarship from the Government of Italy to study Italian at Perugia. She is also a Chevening Scholar and attended at broadcast journalism course at Cardiff. During her stint in UK, she also got an opportunity to meet and greet Queen Elizabeth.

Personal life

Sonia Singh is married to BJP politician Ratanjit Pratap Narain Singh. RPN Singh was a minister in Man Mohan Singh's government from 2009 to 2014. The couple has 3 daughters.

Career

Sonia Singh joined NDTV in 1992 as a researcher when it produced one show, The World This Week for Doordarshan. Today, she is Editorial Director for the NDTV news network and she has overseen news ranging from the Kandahar hijack, the attack on Parliament, 26/11, the Kargil war to the Jessica Lall case.

Awards
She has also received many awards for Best Talk Show, Best Anchor at the emba, as well as Ficci young achiever. In 2015, she was awarded the best Editor in Chief at the Emba awards.

See also

 Ratanjit Pratap Narain Singh, Indian politician
 Ravish Kumar, Indian journalist and anchor
 Sandip Ghose, Indian writer and columnist

References

External links
 
 Sonia Singh at NDTV

1970 births
Living people
Journalists from Delhi
St. Stephen's College, Delhi alumni
Indian broadcast news analysts
Indian women television journalists
Indian television journalists
Indian women television presenters
Indian television presenters
NDTV Group
People from New Delhi
Women writers from Delhi
21st-century Indian women writers
21st-century Indian journalists